The Guayaquil Marathon is a marathon running race in Guayaquil, Ecuador. Held annually on the first Sunday of October, the race draws about 2000 runners. Most participants are from Ecuador; runners from Colombia, Peru, Venezuela, Argentina, Brazil,  the United States, Kenya and other countries also register every year. 

The route both begins and ends at the 5 de Junio Bridge near the Plaza Rodolfo Baquerizo, located at the Malecon del Salado. The course is mostly flat and visits many important locations in the city, including Parque Centenario, the Iguana Park, the Guayaquil Municipal Museum, the Malecon 2000 that overlooks the Guayas river, the Cerro Santa Ana Tunnels, and the Barcelona Sporting Club Stadium, the Urdesa neighborhood. The race also includes a half marathon distance and a 10K run distance.

The Guayaquil Marathon is hosted by the government of Guayaquil municipality, and is certified by the Association of International Marathons and Distance Races (AIMS). DM3, a sports marketing company from Guayaquil, is in charge of the organization of the race since 2005.

Men's Open Division

Women's Open Division

Victories by nationality

See also
List of marathon races in South America

References

Marathons in Ecuador
Recurring sporting events established in 2005
Sport in Guayaquil
2005 establishments in Ecuador